The 1993 New Jersey State Senate elections were held on November 4.

The election took place alongside Christine Todd Whitman's re-election as Governor over Senator Jim McGreevey. Republicans defended the large majority they gained in the 1991 landslide elections.

Four seats changed hands with no impact on the overall balance of power. Republicans Anthony R. Bucco and Diane Allen unseated incumbent Gordon MacInnes and gained the seat of retiring Senator Jack Casey, respectively. Democrats Shirley Turner and Garry Furnari unseated incumbent Republicans Dick LaRossa and John P. Scott, respectively. One Senator, Republican Joseph Bubba, lost a primary. His challenger, Norman M. Robertson, held the seat for the Republicans.

Incumbents not running for re-election

Democratic 
 Jack Casey (District 7)
 Jim McGreevey (District 17) (ran for Governor)

Republican 
 John H. Ewing (District 16)

Summary of results by State Senate district

District 1

District 2

District 3

District 4

District 5

District 6

District 7

District 8

District 9

District 10

District 11

District 12

District 13

District 14

District 15

District 16

District 17

District 18

District 19

District 20

District 21

District 22

District 23

District 24

District 25

District 26

District 27

District 28

District 29

District 30

District 31

District 32

District 33

District 34

Republican primary

General election

District 35

District 36

District 37

District 38

District 39

District 40

References 

New Jersey State Senate elections
New Jersey State Senate
1997 New Jersey elections